The 1956 Oregon State Beavers football team represented Oregon State College in the Pacific Coast Conference (PCC) during the 1956 NCAA University Division football season. In the regular season, the Beavers outscored their opponents 184 to 131 on their way to a 7–2–1 record (6–1–1 in PCC, first). They played three home games on campus at Parker Stadium in Corvallis, with one at Multnomah Stadium in Portland. The team captains were center Dick Corrick and quarterback Gerry Laird.

Led by second-year head coach Tommy Prothro, Oregon State won the PCC title and were ranked tenth in the final AP poll, released in early December. In the Rose Bowl, they met third-ranked Iowa of the Big Ten Conference. The teams had met in early October in Iowa City, and the home team won by a point. In the rematch in southern California on New Year's Day, OSC lost again and finished at 7–3–1.

Schedule

References

External links
 Game program: Oregon State at Washington State – October 20, 1956

Oregon State
Oregon State Beavers football seasons
Pac-12 Conference football champion seasons
Oregon State Beavers football